Influence Vol. 2: The Man I Am is the twenty-first studio album and the second covers album by American country music singer Randy Travis. It is the follow-up to his 2013 album Influence Vol. 1: The Man I Am, and like its predecessor, it features cover songs.

Critical reception
Rating it 3 out of 5 stars, Stephen Thomas Erlewine of Allmusic wrote that "he makes it sound easy when you know damn well it isn't."

Track listing
"I'm Movin' On" (Hank Snow) - 3:06
"Set 'Em Up Joe" (Vern Gosdin, Buddy Cannon, Hank Cochran, Dean Dillon) - 2:31
"Are the Good Times Really Over" (Merle Haggard) - 4:24
"You Nearly Lose Your Mind" (Ernest Tubb) - 2:36
"There! I've Said It Again" (Redd Evans, David Mann) - 2:50
"That's the Way Love Goes" (Lefty Frizzell, Sanger D. Shafer) - 3:08
"Sunday Morning Coming Down" (Kris Kristofferson) - 4:07
"Don't Worry 'bout Me" (Rube Bloom, Ted Koehler) - 3:14
"Mind Your Own Business" (Hank Williams) 3:36
"Only Daddy That'll Walk the Line" (Jimmy Bryant) - 2:41
"For the Good Times" (Kristofferson) - 3:34
"California Blues" (Jimmie Rodgers) - 2:49
"Tonight I'm Playin' Possum" (Keith Gattis, Randy Travis) - 3:41

Chart performance

References

2014 albums
Randy Travis albums
Albums produced by Kyle Lehning
Warner Records albums
Covers albums
Sequel albums